Haliotis laevigata, common name the smooth Australian abalone or greenlip abalone or whitened ear shell, is a species of sea snail, a marine gastropod mollusk in the family Haliotidae, the abalones.

Description

"The large, rather thin shell has an oval shape. The distance of the apex from the margin is one-sixth to one-eighth the length of the shell. The shell is nearly smooth but shows obsolete spiral lirae. The coloration is orange or orange-scarlet, radiately striped with continuous white flames. The coloration consists of continuous oblique stripes of scarlet and whitish. The about 12 perforations are very small. The outline of the shell is oval, with the right and left margins about equally curved. The back of the shell is convex, rounded, and not angulated at the row of perforations. The surface is sculptured with nearly obsolete spiral threads and cords. The spire is moderately elevated. The whorls number about 2½. The inner surface is silvery. The nacre is almost smooth, but shows traces of spiral sulci, and is very minutely wrinkled. The columellar plate is rather wide, sloping inward, flattened, and obliquely truncated at the base. The cavity of the spire is large and rather shallow. The perforations are unusually small, their borders not raised outside."

Distribution
This marine species is endemic to Australia and occurs off South Australia, Victoria, Western Australia and Tasmania.

In Tasmania, the species is generally found on the northern coast, in particular the area of Rocky Cape, and also in the Furneaux Islands. It is one of two abalone species harvested in large quantities in Australia, the other being the blacklip abalone. With decreasing stocks in the wild, the genome has been sequenced as a preliminary to possible aquaculture, this species having a large, highly-palatable muscular foot.

References

Further reading
 Donovan, E. 1808. Conchology. In, The new Cyclopaedia or Universal Dictionary of Arts and Sciences
 Swainson, W. 1822. A catalogue of the rare and valuable shells, which formed the celebrated collection of the late Mrs Bligh. With an appendix, containing descriptions of many new species. London : Publisher unknown 78 pp.
 Quoy, J.R. & Gaimard, J.P. 1834. Voyage de Découvertes de l'Astrolabe exécuté par Ordre du Roi, Pendant les Années 1826–1829. Paris : J. Tastu Zoologie Vol. 3 366 pp.
 Gray, J.E. 1856. On a monstrosity of Haliotis (albicans?). Proceedings of the Zoological Society of London 24: 147–149 
 Wilson, B. 1993. Australian Marine Shells. Prosobranch Gastropods. Kallaroo, Western Australia : Odyssey Publishing Vol. 1 408 pp. 
 Geiger D.L. & Poppe G.T. (2000). A Conchological Iconography: The family Haliotidae. Conchbooks, Hackenheim Germany. 135pp 83pls.
 Geiger, D.L. 2000 [1999]. Distribution and biogeography of the recent Haliotidae (Gastropoda: Vetigastropoda) world-wide. Bollettino Malacologico 35(5–12): 57–120
 Degnan, S.D., Imron, Geiger, D.L. & Degnan, B.M. 2006. Evolution in temperate and tropical seas: disparate patterns in southern hemisphere abalone (Mollusca: Vetigastropoda: Haliotidae). Molecular Phylogenetics and Evolution 41: 249–256
 Geiger D.L. & Owen B. (2012) Abalone: Worldwide Haliotidae. Hackenheim: Conchbooks. viii + 361 pp. [29 February 2012]

External links

 

laevigata
Gastropods described in 1808